

Results
Arsenal's score comes first

London Combination Primary Competition

Primary Competition Final League table

London Combination Supplementary Competition

Supplementary Competition Final League table

References

1915-16
English football clubs 1915–16 season